"Hold On Be Strong" is a song performed by Norwegian singer Maria Haukaas Storeng, written by Mira Craig.

Eurovision Song Contest

The song was elected through the Melodi Grand Prix 2008 on February 9, where she received the highest number of votes from both the televoting and the jury, with 77,566 votes more than the runner up.

On 20 May 2008 Storeng performed the song in the first semi-final of Eurovision, and won a place in the final. It was the last song performed on the night before the voting began. It finished in 5th place with a total of 182 points, thus being the highest ranking Western European song of the year.

The backing singers for the Eurovision performance were Jorunn Hauge, May Kristin Kaspersen, Kariane Kjærnes, Håvard Gryting and Øystein Nesbakken. The song is written by singer and songwriter Mira Craig. Mira and Maria are singing a duet on Maria's 2008 album Hold On Be Strong.

Track listing 
 "Hold On Be Strong" – 3:04
 "Hold On Be Strong" (DeepFrost Cafémix Radio Edit) – 3:00
 "Hold On Be Strong" (DeepFrost Cafémix) – 3:41

Charts

Weekly charts

Year-end charts

References 

Eurovision songs of Norway
Eurovision songs of 2008
Number-one singles in Norway
Universal Music Group singles
English-language Norwegian songs
2008 songs